John David McAfee (18 September 1945 – 23 June 2021) was a British-American computer programmer, businessman, and two-time presidential candidate who unsuccessfully sought the Libertarian Party nomination for president of the United States in 2016 and in 2020. In 1987, he wrote the first commercial anti-virus software, founding McAfee Associates to sell his creation. He resigned in 1994 and sold his remaining stake in the company. McAfee became the company's most vocal critic in later years, urging consumers to uninstall the company's anti-virus software, which he characterized as bloatware. He disavowed the company's continued use of his name in branding, a practice that has persisted in spite of a short-lived corporate rebrand attempt under Intel ownership.

McAfee's fortunes plummeted in the financial crisis of 2007–2008. After leaving McAfee Associates, he founded the companies Tribal Voice (makers of the PowWow chat program), QuorumEx, and Future Tense Central, among others, and was involved in leadership positions in the companies Everykey, MGT Capital Investments, and Luxcore, among others. His personal and business interests included smartphone apps, cryptocurrency, yoga, light-sport aircraft and recreational drug use. He resided for a number of years in Belize, but returned to the United States in 2013 while wanted in Belize for questioning on suspicion of murder.

In October 2020, McAfee was arrested in Spain over U.S. tax evasion charges. U.S. federal prosecutors brought criminal and civil charges alleging that McAfee had failed to file income taxes over a four-year period. On 23 June 2021, he was found dead due to an apparent suicide by hanging in his prison cell near Barcelona shortly after the Spanish National Court authorized his extradition to the U.S. His death generated speculation and conspiracy theories about the possibility that he was murdered. McAfee's wife, Janice McAfee, said she did not believe McAfee committed suicide, and claimed the suicide note was a forgery.

Early life
McAfee was born in Cinderford, in the Forest of Dean, Gloucestershire, England, on 18 September 1945, on a U.S. Army base (of the 596th Ordnance Ammunition Company), to an American father, Don McAfee, who was stationed there, and a British mother, Joan (Williams). His father was from Roanoke, Virginia, and McAfee was himself primarily raised in Salem, Virginia, United States. He said he felt as much British as American. When he was 15, his father, whom a BBC columnist described as "an abusive alcoholic", killed himself with a gun. He had spent his childhood living in fear that a beating from his father could happen at any time, and struggled to make sense of why this was happening to him.

McAfee received a bachelor's degree in mathematics in 1967 from Roanoke College in Virginia, which subsequently awarded him an honorary Doctor of Science degree in 2008. After receiving his bachelor's degree, McAfee began working towards a doctorate in mathematics at Northeast Louisiana State College but was expelled, in about 1968, because of a relationship with an undergraduate student, who became his first wife.

Ventures

NASA, Univac, Xerox, CSC, Booz Allen and Lockheed
McAfee was employed as a programmer by NASA's Institute for Space Studies in New York City from 1968 to 1970 working on the Apollo program. From there, he went to Univac as a software designer, and later to Xerox as an operating system architect. In 1978, he joined Computer Sciences Corporation as a software consultant. He worked for consulting firm Booz Allen Hamilton from 1980 to 1982. In 1986, while employed by Lockheed, he read about the Brain computer virus made for the PC, and he found it terrifying. Sensing a business opportunity, he went about creating an antivirus software that could detect the computer virus and remove it automatically. In 1987 McAfee created McAfee Associates Inc. to sell this software, which he named VirusScan. This was the first anti-virus software brought to market, and one of the first software products to be distributed over the Internet.

McAfee Associates 
Initially McAfee did not seek a large userbase of paying users, but rather wanted to raise awareness of the need to be protected from computer viruses. However, by making people fear such malware, he managed to generate millions of sales, and by 1990 he was making five million dollars a year. The company was incorporated in Delaware in 1992, and had its initial public offering the same year. In August 1993, McAfee stepped down as chief executive and remained with the company as the chief technical officer. He was succeeded by Bill Larson. In 1994 he sold his remaining stake in the company. He had no further involvement in its operations.

After various mergers and ownership changes, Intel acquired McAfee in August 2010. In January 2014, Intel announced that McAfee-related products would be marketed as Intel Security. McAfee expressed his pleasure at the name change, saying, "I am now everlastingly grateful to Intel for freeing me from this terrible association with the worst software on the planet." The business was soon de-merged from Intel, once more under the McAfee name.

PowWow, QuoromEx, MGT and more 
Other business ventures that were founded by McAfee include Tribal Voice, which developed one of the first instant messaging programs, PowWow. In 2000, he invested in and joined the board of directors of Zone Labs, makers of firewall software, prior to its acquisition by Check Point Software in 2003.

In the 2000s McAfee invested in and advertised ultra-light flights, which he marketed as aerotrekking.

In August 2009 The New York Times reported that McAfee's personal fortune had declined to $4 million from a peak of $100 million due to the effect of the financial crisis of 2007–2008 on his investments.

In 2009, McAfee was interviewed in Belize for the CNBC special The Bubble Decade, in which it was reported that he had invested in and/or built many mansions in the USA that went unsold when the 2007 global recession hit. The report also discussed his quest to raise plants for possible medicinal uses on his land in Belize.

In February 2010, McAfee started the company QuorumEx, headquartered in Belize, which aimed to produce herbal antibiotics that disrupt quorum sensing in bacteria.

In June 2013, McAfee uploaded a parody video titled How to Uninstall McAfee Antivirus onto his YouTube channel. In it, he critiques the antivirus software while snorting white powder and being stripped by scantily clad women. It received ten million views. He told Reuters the video was meant to ridicule the media's negative coverage of him. A spokesman for McAfee Inc. called the video's statements "ludicrous".

Also in 2013, McAfee founded Future Tense Central, which aimed to produce a secure computer network device called the D-Central. By 2016, it was also an incubator.

In February 2014, McAfee announced Cognizant, an application for smartphones, which displays information about the permissions of other installed applications. In April 2014, it was renamed DCentral 1, and an Android version was released for free on Google Play.

At the DEF CON conference in Las Vegas in August 2014, McAfee warned people not to use smartphones, suggesting apps are used to spy on clueless consumers who do not read privacy user agreements. In January 2016, he became the chief evangelist for security startup Everykey.

In February 2016, McAfee publicly volunteered to decrypt the iPhone used by Rizwan Farook and Tashfeen Malik in San Bernardino, avoiding the need for Apple to build a backdoor. He later admitted that his claims regarding the ease of cracking the phone were a publicity stunt, while still asserting its possibility.

In May 2016, McAfee was appointed chairman and CEO of MGT Capital Investments, a technology holding company. It initially said it would rename itself John McAfee Global Technologies, although this plan was abandoned due to a dispute with Intel over rights to the "McAfee" name. He changed MGT's focus from social gaming to cybersecurity, saying "anti-virus software is dead, it no longer works", and that "the new paradigm has to stop the hacker getting in" before he or she can do damage.

Soon after joining MGT, McAfee said he and his team had exploited a flaw in the Android operating system that allowed him to read encrypted messages from WhatsApp. Gizmodo investigated his claim, and reported that he had sent reporters malware-infected phones to make this hack work. He replied: "Of course the phones had malware on them. How that malware got there is the story, which we will release after speaking with Google. It involves a serious flaw in the Android architecture."

McAfee moved MGT into the mining of bitcoin and other cryptocurrencies, both to make money for the company, and to increase MGT's expertise in dealing with blockchains, which he thought was important for cybersecurity.

In August 2017, McAfee stepped down as CEO, instead serving as MGT's "chief cybersecurity visionary". In January 2018, he left the company altogether. Both sides said the split was amicable; he said he wanted to spend all of his time on cryptocurrencies, while the company told of pressure from potential investors to disassociate itself from him.

On 13 August 2018, McAfee took a position of CEO with Luxcore, a cryptocurrency company focused on enterprise solutions.

Politics

Positions
McAfee was a libertarian, advocating the decriminalization of cannabis, an end to the war on drugs, non-interventionism in foreign policy, a free market economy which does not redistribute wealth, and upholding free trade. He supported abolishing the Transportation Security Administration.

McAfee advocated increased cyber awareness and more action against the threat of cyberwarfare. He pushed religious liberty, saying that business owners should be able to deny service in circumstances that contradict their religious beliefs, adding: "No one is forcing you to buy anything or to choose one person over another. So why should I be forced to do anything if I am not harming you? It's my choice to sell, your choice to buy."

2016 presidential campaign

On 8 September 2015, McAfee announced a bid for president of the United States in the 2016 presidential election, as the candidate of a newly formed political party called the Cyber Party. On 24 December 2015, he re-announced his candidacy bid saying that he would instead seek the presidential nomination of the Libertarian Party. On the campaign trail, he consistently polled alongside the party's other top candidates, Gary Johnson and Austin Petersen. The three partook in the Libertarian Party's first nationally televised presidential debate on 29 March 2016. His running mate was photographer, commercial real estate broker and Libertarian activist Judd Weiss.

McAfee came in second in the primaries and third at the 2016 Libertarian National Convention.

Notable endorsements
 Adam Kokesh, talk show host and activist
 John Moore, Nevada assemblyman
 L. Neil Smith, science fiction author and activist

2020 presidential campaign

Contrary to his assertion at the 2016 convention, McAfee tweeted on 3 June 2018 that he would run for president again in 2020, either with the Libertarian Party or a separate party that he would create. He later chose to run as a Libertarian. He mainly campaigned for wider cryptocurrency use.

On 22 January 2019, McAfee tweeted that he would continue his campaign "in exile", following reports that he, his wife, and four campaign staff were indicted for tax-related felonies by the IRS. He said he was in "international waters", and had previously tweeted that he was going to Venezuela. The IRS has not commented on the alleged indictments. He defended Communist revolutionary Che Guevara on Twitter, putting himself at odds with Libertarian National Committee chairman Nicholas Sarwark, who wrote, "I hear very little buzz about McAfee this time around ... making a defense of Che Guevara from Cuba may ingratiate him with the Cuban government, but it didn't resonate well with Libertarians."

In a tweet on 4 March 2020, McAfee simultaneously suspended his 2020 presidential campaign, endorsed Vermin Supreme, and announced his campaign for the Libertarian Party vice presidential nomination. The next day, he returned to the presidential field, reversing the suspension of his bid, as "No one in the Libertarian Party Would consider me For Vice President." The next month, he endorsed Adam Kokesh and became Kokesh's vice-presidential candidate, while still seeking the presidency for himself. At the 2020 Libertarian National Convention, he again lost, now to Jo Jorgensen and Spike Cohen for the presidential and vice-presidential slots.

Economic views
McAfee contended that taxes were illegal, and claimed in 2019 that he had not filed a tax return since 2010. He referred to himself as "a prime target" of the Internal Revenue Service.

In July 2017, McAfee predicted on Twitter that the price of a bitcoin would jump to $500,000 within three years, adding: "If not, I will eat my own dick on national television." In July 2019, he predicted a price of $1 million by the end of 2020. In January 2020, he tweeted that his predictions were "a ruse to onboard new users", and that bitcoin had limited potential because it is "an ancient technology."

Legal issues
McAfee was named a defendant in a 2008 civil court case related to his Aerotrekking light-sport aircraft venture and the death of nephew Joel Bitow and a passenger.

On 30 April 2012, McAfee's property in Orange Walk Town, Belize, was raided by the Gang Suppression Unit of the Belize Police Department. A GSU press release said he was arrested for unlicensed drug manufacturing and possession of an unlicensed weapon. He was released without charge.

In 2012, Belize police spokesman Raphael Martinez confirmed that McAfee was neither convicted nor charged, only suspected.

In January 2014, while in Canada, he said that when the Belizean government raided his property, it seized his assets, and that his house later burned down under suspicious circumstances.

On 2 August 2015, McAfee was arrested in Henderson County, Tennessee, on one count of driving under the influence and one count of possession of a firearm while intoxicated.

In July 2019, McAfee and members of his entourage were arrested while his yacht was docked at Puerto Plata, Dominican Republic, on suspicion of carrying high-caliber weapons and ammunition. They were held for four days and released. Weapons were seized, according to the Public Ministry.

On 11 August 2020, McAfee falsely stated that he was arrested in Norway during the COVID-19 pandemic after refusing to replace a lace thong with a more effective face mask. He later tweeted a picture of himself with a bruised eye, claiming it occurred during this arrest. The photo of the alleged arrest shows an officer with the German word for "police" on his uniform, invalidating McAfee's claim of having been arrested in Norway. The Augsburg police later said he tried to enter Germany on that day, but was not arrested.

Death of Gregory Faull 
On 12 November 2012, Belize police began to search for McAfee as a person of interest in connection to the homicide investigation of American expatriate Gregory Viant Faull, who was found dead of a gunshot wound the day before, at his home on the island of Ambergris Caye, the largest island in Belize. Faull was a neighbor of McAfee's. In a contemporary interview with Wired, McAfee said he had been afraid police would kill him and refused their routine questions and evaded them. He buried himself in sand for several hours with a cardboard box over his head. Belize's prime minister, Dean Barrow, called him "extremely paranoid, even bonkers". He fled Belize rather than cooperate.

In December 2012, the magazine Vice accidentally gave away McAfee's location at a Guatemalan resort, when a photo taken by one of its journalists accompanying him was posted with the EXIF geolocation metadata still attached.

While in Guatemala, McAfee asked Chad Essley, an American cartoonist and animator, to set up a blog so he could write about his experience while on the run. He then appeared publicly in Guatemala City, where he unsuccessfully sought political asylum.

On 5 December 2012, he was arrested for illegally entering Guatemala. Shortly afterward, the board reviewing his asylum plea denied it and he was taken to a detention center to await deportation to Belize.

On 6 December 2012, Reuters and ABC News reported that McAfee had two minor heart attacks in the detention center and was hospitalized. His lawyer said he had no heart attacks, rather high blood pressure and anxiety attacks. McAfee later said he faked the heart attacks to buy time for his attorney to file a series of appeals that ultimately prevented his deportation to Belize, thus hastening that government's decision to send him back to the United States.

On 12 December 2012, McAfee was released and deported to the United States.

On 14 November 2018, the Circuit Court in Orlando, Florida, refused to dismiss a wrongful death lawsuit against him for Faull's death.

U.S. tax evasion charges and planned extradition 
In January 2019, McAfee announced that he was on the run from U.S. authorities, and living internationally on a boat following the convening of a grand jury to indict him, his wife, and four of his 2020 Libertarian Party presidential primaries staff on tax evasion charges. At the time, the Internal Revenue Service had not independently confirmed the existence of any such indictment.

On 5 October 2020, McAfee was arrested in Spain at the request of the United States Department of Justice for tax evasion. The June indictment, which was unsealed upon his arrest, alleged he earned millions of dollars from 2014 to 2018, and failed to file income tax returns.

On 6 October, the U.S. Securities and Exchange Commission (SEC) filed a complaint further alleging McAfee and his bodyguard promoted certain initial coin offerings (ICOs) in a fraudulent cryptocurrency pump and dump scheme. It claims he presented himself as an impartial investor when he promoted the ICOs, despite allegedly getting paid $23 million in digital assets in return.

On 5 March 2021, the U.S. Attorney's Office for the
Southern District of New York formally indicted him and an executive adviser on these charges.

McAfee was jailed in Spain, pending extradition to the United States.

On 23 June 2021, the Spanish National Court authorized his extradition to face charges in Tennessee; McAfee is suspected to have committed suicide several hours after the authorization. The New York extradition case was still pending in a lower Spanish court.

Personal life
McAfee married three times. He met his first wife, Fran, circa 1968 while he was working towards a doctorate at Northeast Louisiana State College and she was an 18-year-old undergraduate student. Their affair led to his expulsion from the college. He married his second wife, Judy, a former flight attendant at American Airlines, circa 1987; they divorced in 2002. The night after McAfee arrived in the United States after being deported from Guatemala in December 2012, he was solicited by and slept with Janice Dyson, then a prostitute 30 years his junior in South Beach, Miami Beach, Florida. They began a relationship and married in 2013. She claims that he saved her from human traffickers.

The couple moved to Portland, Oregon, in 2013.

In a 2012 article in Mensa Bulletin, the magazine of the American Mensa, McAfee said developing the first commercial antivirus program had made him "the most popular hacking target" and "[h]ackers see hacking me as a badge of honor". For his own cybersecurity, he said he had other people buy his computer equipment for him, used pseudonyms for setting up computers and logins, and changed his IP address several times a day. When asked on another occasion if he personally used McAfee's antivirus software, he replied: "I take it off[...]it's too annoying."

In 2015, he resided in Lexington, Tennessee. In December 2018, he tweeted that he had "47 genetic children". His third wife described him in a Father's Day message as "father of many, loved by few".

Death
On 23 June 2021, McAfee was found dead in his prison cell at the  near Barcelona, hours after the Spanish National Court ordered his extradition to the United States on criminal charges filed in Tennessee by the United States Department of Justice Tax Division. The Catalan Justice Department said "everything indicates" he killed himself by hanging. An official autopsy confirmed his suicide.

McAfee's death ignited speculation and conspiracy theories about the possibility that he was murdered. In particular, a 2019 tweet  from John McAfee stating "If I suicide myself, I didn't. I was whackd." fueled speculation that McAfee's death may not have been a suicide. McAfee's death drew comparisons to the circumstances of the death of American financier Jeffrey Epstein, who was found dead in August 2019 while awaiting trial on sex trafficking charges. Like with McAfee, the official verdict of Epstein's death was suicide, but many suspect that he was actually murdered. Several times, McAfee claimed if he were ever found dead by hanging, it would mean he was murdered. The day after his death, his lawyer told reporters that while he regularly maintained contact with McAfee in prison, there were no signs of suicidal intent. McAfee's widow reaffirmed this position in her first public remarks since her husband's death, and also called for a "thorough" investigation.

On 13 February 2022, a Spanish court ruled McAfee died by suicide.

In a Netflix documentary released on 24 August 2022, entitled Running With the Devil: The Wild World of John McAfee, McAfee's ex-girlfriend, identified as Samantha Herrera, alleged that McAfee faked his death to avoid tax evasion charges.

In the media
Gringo: The Dangerous Life of John McAfee is a Showtime Networks documentary about the portion of McAfee's life spent in Belize. It began airing in September 2016. It covers allegations against him of raping his former business partner, Allison Adonizio, and murdering Belizean David Middleton and American expat Gregory Faull. In an interview with Bloomberg's Pimm Fox and Kathleen Hayes on 8 September 2016, he said these incidents were fabricated, and "Belize is a third-world banana republic and you can go down there and make any story you want if you pay your interviewees, which Showtime did."

In March 2017, it was reported that Glenn Ficarra and John Requa would direct a film about McAfee titled King of the Jungle, written by Scott Alexander and Larry Karaszewski. At various points, Johnny Depp, Michael Keaton, and Seth Rogen were reported to have taken roles and later to have left the project. In November 2019, Zac Efron was reported to star as journalist Ari Furman.

On 12 May 2017, McAfee and his wife were interviewed on ABC News's 20/20 regarding Faull's alleged murder.

The aforementioned documentary Running With the Devil: The Wild World of John McAfee includes footage from an unreleased documentary by Vice, and interviews by Rocco Castoro, Alex Cody Foster, and Robert King.

Books 
 Computer Viruses, Worms, Data Diddlers, Killer Programs, and Other Threats to Your System. What They Are, How They Work, and How to Defend Your PC, Mac, or Mainframe, (with Colin Haynes) St. Martin's Press, 1989
 The Secret of the Yamas: Spiritual Guide to Yoga, McAfee Pub, 2001
 The Fabric of Self: Meditations on Vanity and Love, Woodland Publications, 2001
 Into the Heart of Truth, Woodland Publications, 2001
 Beyond the Siddhis. Supernatural Powers and the Sutras of Patanjali, Woodland Publications, 2001

References

Further reading

External links 
 Appearances on C-SPAN
 John McAfee's website
 

 
1945 births
2021 deaths
2021 suicides
21st-century American businesspeople
21st-century American politicians
Activists from Virginia
American computer programmers
American drug policy reform activists
American expatriates in Belize
American expatriates in Spain
American libertarians
American people who died in prison custody
American tax resisters
British expatriates in Belize
British people of American descent
British people who died in prison custody
Businesspeople from Virginia
Candidates in the 2016 United States presidential election
Candidates in the 2020 United States presidential election
Computer security specialists
English emigrants to the United States
English libertarians
Fugitives wanted by the United States
Lockheed people
McAfee
Mensans
NASA people
Non-interventionism
People associated with Bitcoin
People associated with cryptocurrency
People extradited from Guatemala
People from Cinderford
People from Lexington, Tennessee
People from Salem, Virginia
People who committed suicide in prison custody
Politicians from Roanoke, Virginia
Prisoners who died in Spanish detention
Privacy activists
Roanoke College alumni
Suicides by hanging in Spain
Tennessee Libertarians